Peter Martyr Vermigli (8 September 1499 – 12 November 1562) was a Reformed theologian of the Reformation period. Born in Florence, he fled Italy to avoid the Roman Inquisition in 1542. He lectured on the Bible in Strasbourg, Zürich and at the University of Oxford. Vermigli was primarily a professor of the Bible, especially the Old Testament. His lectures on I Corinthians, Romans, Judges, Kings, Genesis, and Lamentations were turned into commentaries.

Beginning in 1549, Vermigli became involved in controversy regarding the Eucharist. He published his disputation with Catholics at Oxford University along with a tract on the subject. He later wrote treatises on the Eucharist against Catholics as well as Lutherans. After Vermigli's death, Robert Masson collected the doctrinal passages scattered throughout these commentaries into a systematic theology called the Loci Communes, which became Vermigli's most well-known work. Several of Vermigli's letters and shorter treatises were also published during and after his life. Beginning in 1994, scholars began translating his works into modern English in a series called the Peter Martyr Library.

Biblical commentaries

Vermigli published commentaries on I Corinthians (1551), Romans (1558), and Judges (1561) during his lifetime. He was criticized by his colleagues in Strasbourg for withholding his lectures on books of the Bible for years rather than sending them to be published. Calling his lecture notes on Genesis, Exodus, Leviticus and the Minor Prophets "brief and hasty annotations", he found it difficult to find time to prepare them for publication. His colleagues edited and published some of his remaining works on the Bible after his death: prayers on the Psalms (1564) and commentaries on Kings (1566), Genesis (1569), and Lamentations (1629). Vermigli followed the humanist emphasis on seeking the original meaning of scripture, as opposed to the often fanciful and arbitrary allegorical readings of the medieval exegetical tradition. He occasionally adopted an allegorical reading to interpret the Old Testament as having to do with Christ typologically, but he did not utilize the quadriga method of medieval biblical interpretation, where each passage has four levels of meaning. Vermigli's command of Hebrew, as well as his knowledge of rabbinic literature, surpassed that of most of his contemporaries, including John Calvin, Martin Luther, and Huldrych Zwingli.

Major theological and philosophical works

Vermigli's best known work is the Loci Communes (Latin for "commonplaces"), a collection of the topical discussions scattered throughout his biblical commentaries. The Loci Communes was compiled by Huguenot minister Robert Masson and first published in 1576, fourteen years after Vermigli's death. Vermigli had apparently expressed a desire to have such a book published, and it was urged along by the suggestion of Theodore Beza. Masson followed the pattern of John Calvin's Institutes of the Christian Religion to organize it. Fifteen editions of the Loci Communes spread Vermigli's influence among Reformed Protestants. Anthony Marten translated the Loci Communes into English in 1583, with considerable additional excerpts from Vermigli's works.

Vermigli published an account of his disputation with Oxford Catholics over the Eucharist in 1549, along with a treatise further explaining his position. The disputation largely dealt with the doctrine of transubstantiation, which Vermigli strongly opposed, but the treatise was able to put forward Vermigli's own Eucharistic theology. He weighed in again on Eucharistic controversy in England in 1559. His Defense Against Gardiner was in reply to Stephen Gardiner's 1552 and 1554 Confutatio Cavillationum, itself a reply to the late Thomas Cranmer's work. At 821 folio pages, it was the longest work on the subject published during the Reformation period.

Vermigli's Eucharistic polemical writing was initially directed against Catholics, but beginning in 1557 he began to involve himself in debates with Lutherans. Many Lutherans during this time argued that Christ's body and blood were physically present in the Eucharist because they are ubiquitous, or everywhere. In 1561, Johannes Brenz published a work defending such a view, and Vermigli's friends convinced him to write a response. The result, the Dialogue on the Two Natures in Christ, was written in the form of a dialogue between Orothetes ("Boundary Setter"), a defender of the Reformed doctrine that Christ's body is physically located in heaven, and Pantachus ("Everywhere"), whose speeches are largely taken directly from Brenz's work. Brenz published a response in 1562, to which Vermingli began to prepare a rebuttal, but he died before he was able to complete it.

Minor works

329 of Vermigli's letters  (sent and received) are preserved, written over the period 1542 to 1562. Many of these were for the purpose of exchanging news about the conditions in England, where Protestants suffered persecution under Mary, but they often discussed theological matters as well. His opinion carried a great deal of authority in the Reformed community, especially on the Eucharist. Vermigli used his letters to clarify his position and safeguard the Reformed consensus on the Eucharist against harmful divisions.

Modern English translations
The Peter Martyr Library is an ongoing effort to translate Vermigli's works into modern English. The series is jointly published by Sixteenth Century Journal Publishers and Truman State University Press in Kirksville, Missouri, beginning in 1994.

The Davenant Institute announced in 2017 a project to translate an abridged edition of the Loci Communes into English. It is to be published in installments beginning in 2018 and is expected to be completed in 2025.

Notes and references

Notes

References

Sources

 
 
 
 
 
 
 
 
 
 
 
 
 
 
 
 

Bibliographies of Italian writers
Christian bibliographies